Migadopinae is a subfamily of ground beetles in the family Carabidae. There are about 18 genera and more than 40 described species in Migadopinae.

Tribes
These 2 tribes belong to the subfamily Migadopinae:
 Amarotypini Erwin, 1985  (2 genera found in Australia and New Zealand)
 Migadopini Chaudoir, 1861  (16 genera found in Australia, New Zealand, and South America)

References

Carabidae